Aumond is a township municipality in the Canadian province of Quebec, located within La Vallée-de-la-Gatineau Regional County Municipality.

The township is named after Colonel Joseph-Ignace Aumond (1810–1879), a native of l'Assomption, who was one of the major timber merchants of the Ottawa Valley in the nineteenth century. His operations were particularly along the Gatineau, and even went as far as Lake Timiskaming.

Geography
The township is on the eastern shores of the Gatineau River along Route 107. Numerous lakes surround the town, including Lac des Pins and Lac Murray.

History
The history of Aumond dates back to mid-nineteenth century. In 1861, the Aumond Township was proclaimed, and in 1877 the township municipality was formed.

In 1862, Oblate priests built the first sawmill on the Joseph River, a tributary of the Gatineau River, in order to saw wood from the rich surrounding forests. A few months later, they built a flour mill adjacent to the first mill. At the outset, these mills were powered by a water wheel which was replaced at the beginning of the twentieth century, by a turbine that, from 1929 onwards, also provided electricity to the villagers. Destroyed by flames, these mills were rebuilt and remained active until 1989.

Today, the municipality of Aumond revives its history by the redevelopment of the Moulin des Pères site in the heart of the village.

Demographics 

Population trend:
 Population in 2011: 725 (2006–2011 population change: −6.5 %)
 Population in 2006: 775 (2001–2006 population change: 17.8%)
 Population in 2001: 658 (revised count)
 Population in 1996: 592
 Population in 1991: 594

Private dwellings (occupied by usual residents): 331

Languages:
 English as first language: 6.4%
 French as first language: 92.3%
 Other as first language: 1.3%

References

External links
 MRC de La Vallée-de-la-Gatineau: Aumond

Township municipalities in Quebec
Incorporated places in Outaouais
Populated places established in the 19th century